Suat Onur Ayas (born April 1985 in Ankara) is a Turkish sound editor and record producer.

Life 
Ayas graduated from the Institute of Audio Research NYC in 2005. He also lectured at the School of Audio Engineering (SAE) for 2 years.

Ayas then moved to Istanbul, Turkey, where he worked on over 50 feature films and 200 broadcast commercials.

He earned an Emmy nomination for “Outstanding Sound Editing for a Limited Series, Movie or Special'' for his work on Ava Duverney’s Netflix acclaimed mini series “When They See Us.”

Ayas, won the Gold Reel Award for Outstanding Achievement in Sound Editing in 2017. Golden Reel Award

Filmography 
Pera Palas'ta Gece Yarisi - 2022
Sadan Hanım - 2021
Pure White - 2021
18th & Grand: The Olympic Auditorium Story - 2021
Atlas of Cursed Places - 2020
Justin Jesso: Too Good to Lose - 2020
Duff Takes the Cake - 2019
Washington - 2020
Rise of Empires: Ottoman - 2020/2022
Maserati: The Art of Perception - 2020
Expedition Bigfoot - 2019
Eli - 2019
Ma - 2019
The Untold Story - 2019
Pit Bulls and Parolees - 2009
Family - 2018
Mama - 2017
Shot in the Dark - 2017

References 

Sound editors

Turkish record producers
Living people
1985 births